is a Japanese voice actor and singer born in Ishikawa, Japan. Terashima graduated from Tokyo Announce Gakuin, voice training school. He had initially belonged to Holypeak until December 2008, and then to Production Baobab up until September 2011 when he switched to Axlone, Toshiyuki Morikawa's own agency. He is married to voice actress Satomi Satō. On December 30, 2021, Terashima and Satō announced the birth of their first child.

Filmography

Anime
2005
Genesis of Aquarion: Apollo/Apollonius

2006
Kiba: Gitora
Princess Princess: Harue Wataru

2007
Bleach: Ruri'iro Kujaku
Hidamari Sketch: Mashiko
Saint Beast: Saki
Sisters of Wellber: Jin
Terra e...: Tachyon, Alfred and Sean
Zoku Sayonara Zetsubou Sensei: Kino Kuniya

2008
Goku Sayonara Zetsubou Sensei: Kino Kuniya
Magician's Academy: Sakuma Eitarou
One Outs: Kawanaka Junichi
Shigofumi: Nojima Kaname

2009
Chrome Shelled Regios: Lyia Heia Salinvan
Princess Lover! : Arima Teppei
Zan Sayonara Zetsubou Sensei: Kino Kuniya

2010
Amagami SS: Umehara Masayoshi
Baka and Test: Kubo Toshimitsu
Break Blade: Io
Durarara!!: Togusa Saburo
Maid Sama!: Sarashina Ikuto
Tantei Opera Milky Holmes: Souseki Ishinagare
The Legend of the Legendary Heroes: Orla Sui

2011
C³: Taizo Hakuto
Mobile Suit Gundam AGE: Desil Gallete/Asem Story
Sacred Seven: Tandoji Arma
The Idolmaster: Amagase Touma
Uta no Prince-sama Maji Love 1000% (Season 1): Ittoki Otoya
Metal Fight Beyblade 4D: Bao

2012
Aquarion Evol: Apollo
Amagami SS+: Umehara Masayoshi
Cross Fight B-Daman eS: Genta Ankokuji
Kokoro Connect: Yoshifumi Aoki
Jewelpet Kira☆Deco!: Retsu Akagi/Red
Metal Fight Beyblade Zero-G: Kite Unabara  
My Little Monster: Yamaguchi Kenji
Tantei Opera Milky Holmes: Act 2: Soseki Ishinagare

2013
Ace of Diamond: Naoyuki Zaizen
Blood Lad: Wolf
Hakkenden: Eight Dogs of the East: Kobungo Inuta
Log Horizon: Shiroe
Makai Ouji: Devils and Realist: Dantalion
Mushibugyo: Mugai
The World God Only Knows: Goddesses: Ryo Asama
Tokyo Ravens: Shaver
Uta no Prince-sama Maji Love 2000% (season 2): Ittoki Otoya
White Album 2: Takeya Iizuka

2014
Baby Steps: Kojirō Kageyama
Black Butler: Book of Circus: Snake
Broken Blade: Colonel Io
In Search of the Lost Future: Sō Akiyama
Jinsei: Takayuki Itō
Mekakucity Actors: Shintarō Kisaragi
Log Horizon 2: Shiroe
Love, Chunibyo & Other Delusions -Heart Throb-: Chihiro
PriPara: Usagi
The Irregular at Magic High School: Leonhard Saijo
When Supernatural Battles Became Commonplace: Hajime Kiryū
Amagi Brilliant Park: Wanipee

2015
Baby Steps Season 2: Kojirō Kageyama
Comet Lucifer: Roman Valoff
Cute High Earth Defense Club LOVE!: Gero Akoya
Fairy Tail (season 7): Jackal
Mikagura School Suite: Tonkyun
Uta no Prince-sama Maji Love Revolutions (Season 3): Ittoki Otoya

2016
Servamp: Mahiru Shirota
Super Lovers: Shima Kaidou
Uta no Prince-sama Maji Love Legend Star (season 4): Ittoki Otoya
Haikyū!! Karasuno Kōkō VS Shiratorizawa Gakuen Kōkō: Eita Semi
Sousei no Onmyouji: Tatara

2017
Atom: The Beginning: Ochanomizu Hiroshi
Beyblade Burst God: Sisco Karlisle
Kado: The Right Answer: Yaha-kui zaShunina
Konbini Kareshi: Haruki Mishima
Recovery of an MMO Junkie: Kazuomi Fujimoto
Black Clover: Klaus Lunettes

2018
3D Kanojo: Real Girl: Mitsuya Takanashi
B The Beginning: Kirisame 
Beyblade Burst Super Z: Sisco Karlisle
Kakuriyo: Bed and Breakfast for Spirits: Hatori
Lord of Vermilion: The Crimson King: Minakami Haru
Radiant: Von Tepes
Seven Senses of the Re'Union: Clive Vivali
That Time I Got Reincarnated as a Slime: Satoru Mikami
The iDOLM@STER SideM: Wake Atte Mini!: Amagase Touma
Tsurune: Hiroki Motomura
Wotakoi: Love Is Hard for Otaku: Baba

2019
3D Kanojo: Real Girl 2nd Season: Mitsuya Takanashi
7 Seeds: Ban
The Ones Within: Makino Aikawa
Kochoki: Wakaki Nobunaga: Maeda Toshiie
Try Knights: Tori Fuyuhara
A Certain Scientific Accelerator: Isaac Rosenthal
Is It Wrong to Try to Pick Up Girls in a Dungeon?: Marius Victrix Rakia

2020
Beyblade Burst Superking: Sisco Karlisle
The Misfit of Demon King Academy: Lay Glanzudlii
King's Raid: Successors of the Will: Clause

2021
Log Horizon: Destruction of the Round Table: Shiroe
B: The Beginning Succession: Kirisame 
Tokyo Revengers: Atsushi "Akkun" Sendō
Edens Zero: Shiki Granbell
Osamake: Mitsuru Abe
Rumble Garanndoll: Akatsuki Shinonome

2022
Miss Kuroitsu from the Monster Development Department: Kenji Sadamaki
Aharen-san wa Hakarenai: Raidō
Phantom of the Idol: Hikaru Setouchi
Eternal Boys: Etsurō Aizome

2023
Sugar Apple Fairy Tale: Cat
Sacrificial Princess and the King of Beasts: Anubis
Atelier Ryza: Ever Darkness & the Secret Hideout: Lent Marslink
Ayaka: A Story of Bonds and Wounds: Jingi Sagawa

Original video animation (OVA)
Black Butler: Book of Murder: Snake (2014)
Yankee-kun na Yamada-kun to Megane-chan to Majo: Gaku Izumi (2015)
Hi Score Girl: Extra Stage: Aulbath Ōimachi (2019)

Original net animation (ONA)
Bastard!! Season 2: Joshua Berahia (2023)

Anime Films
Black Butler: Book of the Atlantic: Snake (2017)
The Irregular at Magic High School: The Movie – The Girl Who Summons the Stars: Leonhard Saijo (2017)
Servamp -Alice in the Garden-: Mahiru Shirota (2018)
Uta no Prince-sama: Maji Love Kingdom: Ittoki Otoya (2019)
Uta no Prince-sama: Maji Love ST☆RISH Tours: Ittoki Otoya (2022)

Drama CDs

Brother Shuffle! as Haruki Sakurai
Houkago Play as Kareshi
Mekakucity Actors as Shintarō Kisaragi
Saint Seiya as Gemini Saga and Gemini Kanon
Shuuen -Re:act- Voice Drama CD as C-ta
Benriya-san as Ryuuichi Miyashiro
 Twinkle Stars as Yuuri Murakami

Tokusatsu
Zyuden Sentai Kyoryuger vs. Go-Busters: The Great Dinosaur Battle! Farewell Our Eternal Friends (2014): Neo-Geildon/Neo-Messiah
Ultraman Taiga (2019): Ultraman Taiga
Ultraman Taiga: New Generation Climax (2020): Ultraman Taiga
Ultra Galaxy Fight: The Absolute Conspiracy (2020): Ultraman Taiga

Video games

2005
Fate/Hollow Ataraxia: Avenger/Angra Mainyu

2007
Super Robot Wars: Original Generations: Kōta Azuma
Super Robot Wars Original Generation Gaiden: Kōta Azuma
Fate/tiger colosseum: Avenger
Ijiwaru My Master: Leon
Super Robot Wars Z: Apollo
Amagami: Masayoshi Umehara
Lucian Bee's Resurrection Supernova: Jesse "Kid" Squire

2008
Last Escort 2: Ryou

2009
Soukou Akki Muramasa: Minato Kageaki

2010
Super Robot Taisen OG Saga: Endless Frontier EXCEED: Kōta Kazuma
Moujuutsukai To Oujisama: Sylvio
Uta no Prince-sama: Ittoki Otoya
Uta no Prince-sama: Amazing Aria: Ittoki Otoya

2011
Uta no Prince-sama: Sweet Serenade: Ittoki Otoya
Uta no Prince-sama Repeat: Ittoki Otoya

2012
Moujuutsukai to Oujisama ~Snow Bride~: Sylvio

2013
Uta no Prince-sama All Star: Ittoki Otoya
Seishun Hajimemashita!: Chihaya Futaba
Jojo's Bizarre Aventure: All Star Battle: Prosciutto

2014
Fate/hollow ataraxia: Avenger/Angra Mainyu
Gakuen Heaven 2: Double Scramble: Kuya Sagimori
Granblue Fantasy: Cain
Shinobi, Koi Utsutsu: Sarutobi Sasuke

2015
Uta no Prince-sama All Star After Secret: Ittoki Otoya
Harukanaru Toki no Naka de 6: Arima Hajime

2016
Fate/Grand Order: Thomas Edison, Angra Mainyu
DYNAMIC CHORD feat.Liar-S V edition: Hinoyama Sakura
Harukanaru Toki no Naka de 6 Gentou Rondo: Arima Hajime

2017
Akane-sasu Sekai de Kimi to Utau: Date Masamune
Warriors All-Stars: Arima Hajime

2018
Food Fantasy: Caviar, Yellow Wine, Tortoise Jelly

2019
Atelier Ryza: Ever Darkness & the Secret Hideout : Lent Marslink
Mahoutsukai no Yakusoku: White

2020
Atelier Ryza 2: Lost Legends & the Secret Fairy : Lent Marslink

2022
 Honkai Impact 3rd: Lyle Collodi
 Touken Ranbu Warriors: Omokage
 Arknights: Stainless

2023
 Disgaea 7: Wey-yasu
Atelier Ryza 3: Alchemist of the End & the Secret Key : Lent Marslink

Dubbing
The Gilded Age, Larry Russell (Harry Richardson)
Pawn Shop Chronicles, Johnny Shaw (Elijah Wood)

Discography

Albums

References

External links
Official blog 
Official agency profile 
Takuma Terashima at GamePlaza-Haruka Voice Acting Database 
Takuma Terashima at Hitoshi Doi's Seiyuu Database

1983 births
Living people
Male voice actors from Ishikawa Prefecture
Japanese male voice actors
Japanese male video game actors
21st-century Japanese singers
21st-century Japanese male singers